Yaldabaoth, otherwise known as Jaldabaoth or Ialdabaoth, is a malevolent God and creator of the material world in various Gnostic sects and movements, sometimes represented as a theriomorphic, lion-headed serpent. He is identified as the Demiurge and false god who keeps the souls trapped in physical bodies, imprisoned in the material universe.

Etymology 
The etymology of the name Yaldabaoth has been subject to many speculative theories. 

The first was advanced in 1575 by Feuardentius, supposedly translating it from Hebrew to mean . Matter however interpreted it to mean 'chaos', thus translating Yaldaboath as "child of darkness [...] an element of chaos".

This etymology was popular due to its perceived literary merits. It inspired Hilgenfeld to keep Matter's proposed 'chaos' translation, while fabulating a more plausible sounding, but unattested second noun: Aramaic: בהותא, romanized: bāhūthā. Claiming the name to derive from Aramaic: ילדא בהותא, romanized: yaldā bāhūthā  supposedly meaning 'child of chaos'. This became the late 19th, early 20th century majority view, which was supported by Schenke, Böhlig, and Labib. The latter two also cited a supposed attestation for Aramaic: בהותא, romanized: bāhūthā, lit. 'chaos'. This supposed attestation stemmed from a Targum and was merely a corrupted reading of Aramaic: כהותא, romanized: kāhūthā, lit. 'strife' published in a 1859 Bible. This pseudo-variant was translated in Jastrow's popular Aramaic dictionary as 'confusion'.

Helped by these events, Hilgenfeld's etymology remained the majority view until a 1974 analysis by Scholem explained its origin. Consequently most scholars retracted their support. Additionally, Scholem argued that based on the earliest textual data, which termed Yaldabaoth "the King of Chaos", he was claimed to be the progenitor of chaos, not its progeny.

Scholem's own theory rendered the name as Yald' Abaoth. Thus he rendered Yald' Abaoth as 'begetter of Sabaoth'. Black objects to this, because Sabaoth is the name of one of Yaldaboth's sons in some Gnostic texts. Instead he suggests the second noun to be Jewish Aramaic: בהתייה, romanized: behūṯā, lit. 'shame'. Thus Blacks' proposal renders Aramaic: ילדא בהתייה, romanized: yaldā behūṯā, lit. 'son of shame/Ba'al'. 

This he interpreted however to describe more broadly 'the power of generation'; thus suggesting the name to mean 'the bringing fourth of the power of generation'.

 Historical origins 

At least from 200 BCE onwards a tradition developed in the Graeco-Egyptian Ptolemaic Kingdom which identified Yahweh, the god of the Jews, with the Egyptian god Seth. Following the Assyrian conquest of Egypt in the 7th century BCE, Seth was seen as an evil deity by the Egyptians and not commonly worshipped, in large part due to his role as the god of foreigners. Seth's appearance was thought of as resembling a man with a donkey's head. The Greek practice of interpretatio graeca, ascribing the gods of another people's pantheon to corresponding ones in one's own, had been adopted by the Egyptians after their Hellenisation; during the process of which they had identified Seth with Typhon, a snake-monster, which roars like a lion. 

The story of the Exodus, featured in the Hebrew Bible, speaks of the Jews as a nation betrayed and subjugated by the Pharaoh, for whom Yahweh subjects Egyptians to ten plagues — destroying their country, defiling the Nile, and killing all their first-born sons. Jewish migration within the Hellenised Ptolemaic Kingdom to Greek-speaking Egyptian cities such as Alexandria led to the creation of the Septuagint, a translation of the Hebrew Bible into Koine Greek. Egyptian receptions of the Exodus story were widely negative, because it insulted their gods and praised their suffering. Thus it inspired Egyptian works retelling the story, but changing its details to mock the Jews and exalt Egypt and its gods.

From this arose a popular response to the Jewish accusation that Egyptians were merely worshipping beasts, namely that, in truth, the Jews themselves worshipped a beast, a donkey or a donkey-headed man, ie Seth.

Accusations of onolatry against the Jews, spread from the Egyptian milieu, with its understanding of the donkey's Seth-related importance, to the rest of the Graeco-Roman world, which was largely ignorant of this context. In the most famous variation of narratives alleging Jewish onolatry Antiochus IV Epiphanes, a Seleucid king famous for raiding the Jerusalem Temple, supposedly discovered, that its Holiest of Holies was not empty, but instead contained a donkey idol. After the emergence of Christianity the same charge was also repeated against its followers. Most famously so in the earliest known depiction of the crucifixion of Jesus, the Alexamenos graffito, where a Christian by the name of Alexamenos is shown worshipping a donkey-headed crucified god.

According to Litwa, this tradition forms the basis for the development of Gnostic beliefs about Yaldabaoth.

 Role in Gnosticism 

Gnosticism originated in the late 1st century CE in non-rabbinical Jewish and early Christian sects. In the formation of Christianity, various sectarian groups, labeled "gnostics" by their opponents, emphasised spiritual knowledge (gnosis) of the divine spark within, over faith (pistis) in the teachings and traditions of the various communities of Christians. Gnosticism presents a distinction between the highest, unknowable God, and the Demiurge, "creator" of the material universe. Gnostics considered the most essential part of the process of salvation to be this personal knowledge, in contrast to faith as an outlook in their worldview along with faith in the ecclesiastical authority.

In Gnosticism, the biblical serpent in the Garden of Eden was praised and thanked for bringing knowledge (gnosis) to Adam and Eve and thereby freeing them from the malevolent Demiurge's control. Gnostic Christian doctrines rely on a dualistic cosmology that implies the eternal conflict between good and evil, and a conception of the serpent as the liberating savior and bestower of knowledge to humankind opposed to the Demiurge or creator god, identified with the Yaweh from the Hebrew Bible. Gnostic Christians considered the Hebrew God of the Old Testament as the evil, false god and creator of the material universe, and the Unknown God of the Gospel, the father of Jesus Christ and creator of the spiritual world, as the true, good God. In the Archontic, Sethian, and Ophite systems, Yaldabaoth (Yahweh) is regarded as the malevolent Demiurge and false god of the Old Testament who generated the material universe and keeps the souls trapped in physical bodies, imprisoned in the world full of pain and suffering that he created.

However, not all Gnostic movements regarded the creator of the material universe as inherently evil or malevolent. For instance, Valentinians believed that the Demiurge is merely an ignorant and incompetent creator, trying to fashion the world as well as he can, but lacking the proper power to maintain its goodness. They were regarded as heretics by the proto-orthodox Early Church Fathers.

Yaldabaoth is primarily mentioned in the Archontic, Sethian, and Ophite writings of Gnostic literature, most of which have been discovered in the Nag Hammadi library. In the Apocryphon of John, "Yaldabaoth" is the first of three names of the domineering archon, along with Saklas and Samael. In Pistis Sophia he has lost his claim to rulership and, in the depths of Chaos, together with 49 demons, tortures sacrilegious souls in a scorching hot torrent of pitch. Here he is a lion-faced archon, half flame, half darkness. Yaldabaoth appears as a rebellious angel both in the apocryphal Gospel of Judas and the Gnostic work Hypostasis of the Archons. In some of these Gnostic texts, Yaldabaoth is further identified with the Ancient Roman god Saturnus.

Cosmogony and creation myths
Yaldabaoth is the son of Sophia, the personification of wisdom in Gnosticism, with whom he contends. By creatively turning to matter in goodness and simplicity, Sophia created the imperfect Yaldabaoth, who has no knowledge of the other aeons. From his mother he received the powers of light, but he used them for evil. Sophia rules over the Ogdoas, the Demiurge over the Hebdomas. Yaldabaoth created six more archons and other fellows. The angels he created rebelled against Yaldabaoth. To keep the angels in subjection, Yaldabaoth generated the material universe.

In the act of creation, however, Yaldabaoth emptied himself of his supreme power. When Yaldabaoth breathed the soul into the first man, Adam, Sophia instilled in him the divine spark of the spirit. After matter, Yaldabaoth produced the serpent spirit (Ophiomorphos), which is the origin of all evil. The light being Sophia caused the fall of man through the serpent. By eating the forbidden fruit, Adam and Eve became enlightened and turned away from Yaldabaoth. Eventually, Yaldabaoth expelled them from the ethereal region, the Paradise, as punishment.

Yaldabaoth continuously attempted to deprive human beings of the gift of the spark of light which he had unwittingly lost to them, or to keep them in bondage. As punishments, he tried to make humanity acknowledge him as God. Because of their lack of worship, he caused the Flood upon the human race, from which a feminine power such as Sophia or Pronoia (Providence) rescued Noah. Yaldabaoth made a covenant with Abraham, in which he was obligated to serve him along with his descendants. The Biblical prophets were to proclaim Yaldabaoth's glory, but at the same time, through Sophia's influence, they reminded people of their higher origin and prepared for the coming of Christ. At Sophia's instigation, Yaldabaoth arranged for the generation of Jesus through the Virgin Mary. For his proclamation, he used John the Baptist. At the moment of the baptism organized by Yaldabaoth, Sophia took on the body of Jesus and through it taught people that their destiny was the Kingdom of Light (the spiritual world), not the Kingdom of Darkness (the material universe). Only after his baptism did Jesus receive divine powers and could perform miracles. But since Jesus destroyed his kingdom instead of promoting it, Yaldabaoth had him crucified. Before his martyrdom, Christ escaped from the bodily shell and returned in the spiritual world.

 In popular culture 
 In H.P. Lovecraft's short story The Horror at Red Hook (1925), Robert Suydam invokes Yaldabaoth (by the name Samaël) among the likes of Sephiroth and Ashmodai.
 In the SCP Foundation collaborative writing project, Yaldabaoth is a prominent figure in the mythologies of Sarkicism and the various traditions dedicated to worshiping Mekhane, religions that have a variety of origins in different canons, but are described on the Church of the Broken God hub page as having come from Ancient China. In Sarkicism, Yaldabaoth (also known as "Važjuma") is the principal power in the universe with six archons that levied several ordeals against the Sarkic prophet, Ion, who himself ascended to godhood upon overcoming them. It is the Sarkites' goal to surpass and destroy Yaldabaoth, and rejoin Grand Karcist Ion in their holy land, "Adytum" (also known as Adí-üm and Samādhi). In the Broken God religions, Yaldabaoth was a feral flesh god trapped inside the body of a wise mechanical god named Mekhane (also known as the Broken God) after an unclear struggle left them both unable to interfere with humanity and Mekhane becoming broken. The adherents (known as Mekhanites in some canons) of these religious groups, or "churches", believed Mekhane's sacrifice allowed humanity to advance technologically. It is the goal of the Broken God churches to collect and reassemble Mekhane's broken parts, and to oppose the Sarkites due to their association with Yaldabaoth.
 In the video game Persona 5 (2016), Yaldabaoth is a malevolent being that appears in the form of the Holy Grail: a Treasure of Mementos created from humanity's wish for order and control. The overarching antagonist of the game, Yaldabaoth leads the conspiracy to give Masayoshi Shido political power and sponsors the Phantom Thieves of Hearts to see which is stronger: their salvation of the world or Goro Akechi's desire to destroy and recreate the world.
 In the video game Assassin's Creed Valhalla (2020), the names Yaldabaoth, Saklas, and Samael are mentioned as individual members of the Isu, an ancient and highly-advanced species. Known as the "Father of Understanding", the "Mother of Wisdom", and the "Sacred Voice" respectively, the triad were responsible for the early stages of Project Anthropos, which was the creation of humanity.
 In Andrew Hussie's multimedia literary work Homestuck, a character named Yaldabaoth, in the shape of a snake with a sun-like head, appears. He is a Denizen, a powerful enemy created by the code of SBURB for a player or players to overcome. Caliborn defeated Yaldabaoth to achieve his more powerful Lord English form through vague means.
 Yaldabaoth was referenced as inspiration for the British deathcore band Infant Annihilator's studio album The Battle of Yaldabaoth (2019).

See also

 Ancient Canaanite religion
 Ancient Semitic religion
 Atenism
 Baháʼí Faith and the unity of religion
 Dhimmi Demiurge
 Dystheism
 Ethical monotheism
 Evil God Challenge
 False prophet
 God in Abrahamic religions
 God in the Baháʼí Faith
 God in Christianity
 God in Judaism
 God in Islam
 God in Mormonism
 Jehovah's Witnesses beliefs § God
 God in Zoroastrianism
 Maltheism
 Moralistic therapeutic deism
 Outline of theology
 Prince of Darkness (Manichaeism)
 Problem of evil
 Problem of Hell
 Religion in pre-Islamic Arabia
 Satanic Verses
 Theistic Satanism
 Theodicy
 Trickster god
 Urmonotheismus (primitive monotheism)
 Violence in the Bible
 Violence in the Quran

 Notes 

References

Bibliography
 Matthew Black: An Aramaic Etymology for Jaldabaoth? In: Alastair H. Logan, Alexander J. M. Wedderburn (Hrsg.): The New Testament and Gnosis. T&T Clark International, New York 1983, ISBN 0-567-09344-1, S. 69–72. (Paperback-Ausgabe 2004, ISBN 0-567-08228-8)
 Attilio Mastrocinque: From Jewish Magic to Gnosticism (Studien und Texte zu Antike und Christentum 24). Mohr Siebeck, Tübingen 2005, ISBN 3-16-148555-6.
 Karen L. King: The Secret Revelation of John''. Harvard University Press, 2006, ISBN 0-674-01903-2, S. 89–105.

External links

Chaos gods
Creator gods
Demons in Gnosticism
Early Christianity and Gnosticism
Evil gods
Gnostic deities
Lion deities
Names of God in Gnosticism
Sethianism
Snake gods
Trickster gods
Yahweh